The 2017–18 Colorado Buffaloes men's basketball team represented the University of Colorado in the 2017–18 NCAA Division I men's basketball season. They were led by head coach Tad Boyle in his eighth season at Colorado. The Buffaloes played their home games at Coors Events Center in Boulder, Colorado as members of the Pac-12 Conference. They finished the season 17–15, 8–10 in Pac-12 play to finish in a tie for eighth place. They defeated Arizona State in the first round of the Pac-12 tournament before losing in the quarterfinals to Arizona.

Previous season
The Buffaloes finished the 2016–17 season 19–15, 8–10 in Pac-12 play to finish in seventh place. They defeated Washington State in the first round of the Pac-12 tournament to advance to the quarterfinals where they lost to Arizona. They were invited to the National Invitation Tournament where they lost in the first round to UCF.

Off-season

Departures

2017 recruiting class

2018 Recruiting class

Roster

Schedule and results

|-
!colspan=12 style=| Exhibition

|-
!colspan=12 style=| Non-conference regular season

|-
!colspan=12 style=|  Pac-12 regular season

|-
!colspan=12 style=| Pac-12 tournament

References

Colorado
Colorado Buffaloes men's basketball seasons
Colorado Buffaloes
Colorado Buffaloes